Thutolore Secondary School is a government secondary school on Madubane Street in Soweto, Johannesburg

History
The school had some involvement in the Soweto Uprising which started on 16 June 1976. This started with a student march from the schools of Soweto objecting to a government order that schools should use Afrikaans to teach certain subjects. 

A crisis meeting had been held at Thutolore School on the weekend of 6 March 1976 where local parents firmly rejected the idea of instruction in Afrikaans. The parents noted that they paid for the education and instructed the representative of 
the "homeland" of Bophuthatswana to take their objection to central government.

References

Buildings and structures in Soweto
High schools in South Africa
Schools in Gauteng